Caligata Lake Provincial Park is a provincial park in British Columbia, Canada, located northeast of Clearwater. The lake occupies a cirque below the north face of Raft Mountain. The park has no visitor facilities or services.

Access is by Spahats Creek Road off the Clearwater Valley Road (also called Wells Gray Park Road), then there is a short hike to the lake.

Cross-country hiking routes lead from Caligata Lake to the nearby Cirque of Tarns and Spahats Hill. A more rigorous hike ascends to the east ridge of Raft Mountain from where a skyline walk can go in either direction to Raft's multiple summits.

The name comes from the Latin for the hoary marmot, marmota caligata.

References

BC Parks webpage

See also
Wells Gray Provincial Park
Trophy Mountain
Spahats Falls

Provincial parks of British Columbia
Wells Gray-Clearwater
Thompson Country
1996 establishments in British Columbia